The 1963 DFB-Pokal Final decided the winner of the 1962–63 DFB-Pokal, the 20th season of Germany's knockout football cup competition. It was played on 14 August 1963 at the Niedersachsenstadion in Hanover. Hamburger SV won the match 3–0 against Borussia Dortmund, to claim their 1st cup title.

Route to the final
The DFB-Pokal began with 16 teams in a single-elimination knockout cup competition. There were a total of three rounds leading up to the final. Teams were drawn against each other, and the winner after 90 minutes would advance. If still tied, 30 minutes of extra time was played. If the score was still level, a replay would take place at the original away team's stadium. If still level after 90 minutes, 30 minutes of extra time was played. If the score was still level, a drawing of lots would decide who would advance to the next round.

Note: In all results below, the score of the finalist is given first (H: home; A: away).

Match

Details

References

External links
 Match report at kicker.de 
 Match report at WorldFootball.net
 Match report at Fussballdaten.de 

Borussia Dortmund matches
Hamburger SV matches
1962–63 in German football cups
1963
Sports competitions in Hanover
20th century in Hanover
August 1963 sports events in Europe